Howard Thompson may refer to:
 Howard Thompson (film critic) (1919–2002), film critic for The New York Times
 Howard Thompson (wargame designer), game designer and owner of Metagaming Concepts